Sydney George Smith  (19 January 1879 – 21 May 1943) was a New Zealand politician of the Liberal Party and then the National Party, and a cabinet minister.

Early life

Smith was born in New Plymouth in 1879. His parents were the MHR Edward Smith and Mary Ann Golding. He enjoyed rugby during his youth, and later became an administrator for the sport for the Taranaki Region.

On 19 November 1901, he married Elsie Rose Herbert (known as Rose) at St Mary's Church in New Plymouth. She was a daughter of G H Herbert of the Royal Engineers. They had three children: Rosa Maud (b. 1902), Ethel Mary (b. 1905), and Edward George (b. 1906). His wife died on 3 April 1913, aged 35.

Smith remarried on 25 February 1915, to Catherine (Kate) Bint, again at St Mary's Church. He had a further three children from his second marriage: Raymond Sydney (1916–1944), Harry Allman (1918–1998), and Lorna Hazel (b. 1922).

He worked in the New Zealand Railways for 20 years, and for 13 years held office in the Amalgamated Society of Railway Servants.

Political career

Smith held various offices with trade unions. He was on the New Plymouth Borough Council. He had interests in education.

Smith sat together with the other Labour MPs in Parliament but always stressed his independence. Soon after entering the house MP Charles Wilkinson referred to Labour Party leader Alfred Hindmarsh as the "leader" of Smith. In reply Smith said "You leave the member for Taranaki alone, he will choose his own leader."

In 1925 he stood unsuccessfully for New Plymouth for the Liberal Party.

Smith was Minister of Labour and Minister of Mines in the United Government from 28 May 1930 to 22 September 1931. He was Minister of Education in the United–Reform Coalition from 22 November 1934 to 6 December 1935. He was Chairman of Committees from 11 December 1928 to 28 May 1930, and again from 27 October 1931 to 12 February 1935.

In 1935, he was awarded the King George V Silver Jubilee Medal.

Death
Smith, who was known as Sid to his friends, died on 21 May 1943 at New Plymouth, and was buried at Te Henui Cemetery. He was survived by his second wife and his six children. All three of his sons were at the time serving overseas in World War II. His son Raymond was killed on 24 December 1943 by a sniper in Italy.

Notes

References

|-

|-

|-

1879 births
1943 deaths
Independent MPs of New Zealand
New Zealand Liberal Party MPs
New Zealand National Party MPs
Members of the Cabinet of New Zealand
United Party (New Zealand) MPs
New Zealand education ministers
New Zealand MPs for North Island electorates
Members of the New Zealand House of Representatives
Unsuccessful candidates in the 1938 New Zealand general election
Unsuccessful candidates in the 1925 New Zealand general election
Burials at Te Henui Cemetery